The 2015 Under-20 Five Nations Series was a preparatory tournament for the 2015 FIFA U-20 World Cup. All games were played in New Zealand.

References 

2014–15 in New Zealand association football
2014–15 in Ghanaian football
2014–15 in Panamanian football
2014–15 in Qatari football
2015 in Australian soccer
2015 Under-20 Five Nations Series